Meisam Nassiri (born 1 June 1989) is an Iranian freestyle wrestler who won a gold medal at the 2016 Asian Wrestling Championships.

Wrestling career 
He competed at the 2016 Olympics, but was eliminated in the first bout. In the Asian Championships 2017, he lost to Bajrang of India.

Personal life 
He was born in a village called Zarnan in Zanjan and still lives there;

Meysam Nassiri, even after joining the national team, did not forget his hometown and continues to work in agriculture and animal husbandry;

Meysam Nasiri established a horse riding club in Zarnan, named after him.

References

External links
 

Living people
Wrestlers at the 2016 Summer Olympics
Iranian male sport wrestlers
Olympic wrestlers of Iran
People from Zanjan, Iran
1989 births
Asian Wrestling Championships medalists
Islamic Solidarity Games medalists in wrestling
20th-century Iranian people
21st-century Iranian people
Islamic Solidarity Games competitors for Iran